Vitali Vyacheslavovich Kuznetsov (born 21 February 1986) is a former Russian footballer.

External links
  Profile at official RFPL site

1986 births
Living people
Russian footballers
Russian expatriate footballers
Expatriate footballers in Finland
FC Baltika Kaliningrad players
FC Akhmat Grozny players
Russian Premier League players
Association football midfielders